Kharian railway station (Urdu and ) is located in Kharianin Kharian Tehsil of Gujrat District, Punjab province, Pakistan.

See also
 List of railway stations in Pakistan
 Pakistan Railways
 Kharian
 Kharian Tehsil
 Gujrat District

References

External links

Railway stations in Gujrat District
Railway stations on Karachi–Peshawar Line (ML 1)